Raimondo is an Italian surname. Notable people with the surname include:

Gina Raimondo (born 1971), American politician serving as Secretary of Commerce
Justin Raimondo (1951–2019), American author and the editorial director of the website Antiwar
Miguel Ángel Raimondo (born 1943), Argentine football midfielder
Saverio Raimondo (born 1984), Italian actor and comedian

See also 

 Raimondi (surname)
 Raimondo

Italian-language surnames
Patronymic surnames
Surnames from given names